Sayssouq   is a  village in Akkar Governorate, Lebanon.

The population in Sayssouq  is mainly  Maronite.

History
In 1838, Eli Smith noted  the village as Seisuk,  whose inhabitants were Sunni Muslims and Maronite, located west of esh-Sheikh Mohammed.

In 1856 it was named Seisuk on the Kiepert's map of Palestine/Lebanon that Heinrich Kiepert published that year,

References

Bibliography

External links
Sayssouq, Localiban 

Populated places in Akkar District
Maronite Christian communities in Lebanon